"(I Wanna) Love My Life Away" is a song written and sung by Gene Pitney, which he released in 1961. The song was Pitney's first charting single, and spent 8 weeks on the Billboard Hot 100 chart, peaking at No. 39, while reaching No. 23 on Canada's CHUM Hit Parade. In the United Kingdom, the song spent 11 weeks on the Record Retailer chart, reaching No. 26.

Jody Miller released a version in 1978, which reached No. 67 on Billboards Hot Country Singles chart.

Chart performance

References

1961 songs
1961 singles
Gene Pitney songs
Musicor Records singles
Songs written by Gene Pitney